Zlatopramen (meaning "golden well") is a brand of beer that was produced by Drinks Union, later by Heineken in the Krásné Březno brewery. 

The Zlatopramen brand was first registered in 1967, when it was chosen after a naming competition. In 2011, the Krásné Březno brewery was closed and Zlatopramen continued to be brewed by other breweries of the Heineken Group.

See also

 Beer in the Czech Republic
 Staropramen Brewery

References 

Beer brands of the Czech Republic